Maplecrest is a hamlet in Greene County, New York, United States. Maplecrest has a post office with ZIP code 12454.

References

Hamlets in Greene County, New York
Hamlets in New York (state)